Deh-e Shadi Jamal Zehi (also Romanized as Deh-e Shādī Jamāl Zehī; also known as Deh-e Shādī) is a village in Jahanabad Rural District, in the Central District of Hirmand County, Sistan and Baluchestan Province, Iran. At the 2006 census, its population was 134, in 24 families.

References 

Populated places in Hirmand County